The Lhop or Doya people are a little-known tribe of southwest Bhutan. The Bhutanese believe them to be the aboriginal inhabitants of the country. The Lhop are found in the low valleys of Dorokha Gewog and near Phuntsholing in the Duars. 
The dress of the Lhop resembles the Lepcha, but they bear little similarity with the Bhutia in the North and the Toto in the west. The Doya trace their descent matrilineally, marry their cross cousins, and embalm the deceased who are then placed in a foetal position in a circular sarcophagus above the ground. They follow a blend of Tibetan Buddhism mixed with animism.

See also
Ethnic groups in Bhutan
Sharchop

References

External links
 RAOnline Bhutan: The Lhop

Ethnic groups in Bhutan